Daab chingri, also known as chingri daab, is a Bengali prawn curry, cooked and served in green coconut.

Ingredients 
The main ingredients are large prawns, tender green coconut with malai, along with butter or ghee or mustard oil, onions, turmeric powder, chopped green chilli, garlic paste, and ginger paste flavoured with spices. The prawn curry is both cooked and served in a green coconut, which adds a flavour in it.

Popularity 
Daab Chingri is a popular Bengali dish. It is often cooked during Pohela Boishakh, Raksha Bandhan, and other events. Other than being popular in Kolkata, this dish is also served in restaurants in Mumbai, Bangalore, etc.

References 

Bengali cuisine
Bangladeshi cuisine
Bengali curries
Indian seafood dishes